The 2000 Florida Gators football team represented the University of Florida in the sport of American football during the 2000 NCAA Division I-A football season.  The Gators competed in Division I-A of the National Collegiate Athletic Association (NCAA) and the Eastern Division of the Southeastern Conference (SEC), and played their home games at Ben Hill Griffin Stadium on the university's Gainesville, Florida campus.  They were coached by Steve Spurrier, who led the Gators to their sixth SEC championship, a Sugar Bowl berth, and an overall win–loss record of 10–3 (.769).  The season was the team's eleventh of twelve under Spurrier.

Schedule

Game summaries

Ball State

Middle Tennessee St.

Tennessee

Kentucky

Mississippi State

September 30, 2000

The Florida Gators came into Davis Wade Stadium in Starkville, Mississippi ranked third in the nation.  The unranked Mississippi State Bulldogs ran for 351 yards, 172 yards and a touchdown for Dicenzo Miller, and 156 yards and a touchdown for Dontae Walker.  Bulldogs quarterback Wayne Madkin also ran for two touchdowns.  The Bulldogs compiled 517 total yards of offense.

A frustrated Steve Spurrier rotated three quarterbacks including Rex Grossman.  Grossman went 13 for 16 with 231 yards and two touchdowns.  All together, the Gators had 494 yards and four touchdowns through the air.

Mississippi State won the game 47–35, breaking Florida's 72-game winning streak against unranked teams in front of a crowd of 43,816.  After the game, the Mississippi State fans stormed the field and tore down the goal posts, parts of which ended up all over campus.

LSU

Auburn

Georgia

Vanderbilt

South Carolina

Florida State

SEC Championship Game

Source:

Miami (Sugar Bowl)

Rankings

Notable players
 07 QB Jesse Palmer (Sr.)
 08 QB Rex Grossman (Fr.)
 09 QB Brock Berlin (Fr.)
 05 RB Earnest Graham (So.)
 33 RB Ran Carthon (Fr.)
 06 WR Taylor Jacobs (So.)
 10 WR Jabar Gaffney (Fr.)
 17 WR Reche Caldwell (So.)
 78  T Kenyatta Walker (Jr.)
 91 DE Derrick Chambers (Sr.)
 57 DE Bobby McCray (Fr.)
 61 DT Gerard Warren (Jr.)
 45 LB Andra Davis (Jr.)
 03 CB Lito Sheppard (So.)
 04  S Marquand Manuel (Jr.)

References

Bibliography
 2009 Southeastern Conference Football Media Guide, Florida Year-by-Year Records, Southeastern Conference, Birmingham, Alabama, p. 60 (2009).
 Carlson, Norm, University of Florida Football Vault: The History of the Florida Gators, Whitman Publishing, LLC, Atlanta, Georgia (2007).  .
 Golenbock, Peter, Go Gators!  An Oral History of Florida's Pursuit of Gridiron Glory, Legends Publishing, LLC, St. Petersburg, Florida (2002).  .
 Hairston, Jack, Tales from the Gator Swamp: A Collection of the Greatest Gator Stories Ever Told, Sports Publishing, LLC, Champaign, Illinois (2002).  .
 McCarthy, Kevin M.,  Fightin' Gators: A History of University of Florida Football, Arcadia Publishing, Mount Pleasant, South Carolina (2000).  .

Florida
Florida Gators football seasons
Southeastern Conference football champion seasons
Florida Gators football